The literary concept of the heteronym refers to one or more imaginary character(s) created by a writer to write in different styles. Heteronyms differ from pen names (or pseudonyms, from the Greek words for "false" and "name") in that the latter are just false names, while the former are characters that have their own supposed physiques, biographies, and writing styles.

Heteronyms were named and developed by the Portuguese writer and poet Fernando Pessoa in the early 20th century, but they were thoroughly explored by the Danish philosopher Kierkegaard in the 19th century and have also been used by other writers.

Pessoa's heteronyms

In Pessoa's case, there are at least 70 heteronyms (according to the latest count by Pessoa's editor Teresa Rita Lopes). Some of them are relatives or know each other; they criticise and translate each other's works. Pessoa's three chief heteronyms are Alberto Caeiro, Ricardo Reis and Álvaro de Campos; the latter two consider the former their master. There are also two whom Pessoa called semi-heteronyms, Bernardo Soares and the Baron of Teive, who are semi-autobiographical characters who write in prose, "a mere mutilation" of the Pessoa personality. There is, lastly, an orthonym, Fernando Pessoa, the namesake of the author, who also considers Caeiro his master.

The heteronyms dialogue with each other and even with Pessoa in what he calls "the theatre of being" or "drama in people". They sometimes intervened in Pessoa's social life: during Pessoa's only attested romance, a jealous Campos wrote letters to the girl, who enjoyed the game and wrote back.

Pessoa, also an amateur astrologer, created in 1915 the heteronym Raphael Baldaya, a long bearded astrologer. He elaborated horoscopes of his main heteronyms in order to determine their personalities.

Fernando Pessoa on the heteronyms

How do I write in the name of these three? Caeiro, through sheer and unexpected inspiration, without knowing or even suspecting that I'm going to write in his name. Ricardo Reis, after an abstract meditation, which suddenly takes concrete shape in an ode. Campos, when I feel a sudden impulse to write and don't know what. (My semi-heteronym Bernardo Soares, who in many ways resembles Álvaro de Campos, always appears when I'm sleepy or drowsy, so that my qualities of inhibition and rational thought are suspended; his prose is an endless reverie. He's a semi-heteronym because his personality, although not my own, doesn't differ from my own but is a mere mutilation of it. He's me without my rationalism and emotions. His prose is the same as mine, except for certain formal restraint that reason imposes on my own writing, and his Portuguese is exactly the same – whereas Caeiro writes bad Portuguese, Campos writes it reasonably well but with mistakes such as "me myself" instead of "I myself", etc.., and Reis writes better than I, but with a purism I find excessive...)

 Fernando Pessoa, Letter to Adolfo Casais Monteiro, 13.01.1935, in The Book of Disquiet, tr. Richard Zenith, Penguin Classics, 2002, p. 474.

George Steiner on the heteronyms

Pseudonymous writing is not rare in literature or philosophy (Kierkegaard provides a celebrated instance). 'Heteronyms', as Pessoa called and defined them, are something different and exceedingly strange. For each of his 'voices', Pessoa conceived a highly distinctive poetic idiom and technique, a complex biography, a context of literary influence and polemics and, most arrestingly of all, subtle interrelations and reciprocities of awareness. Octavio Paz defines Caeiro as 'everything that Pessoa is not and more'.

He is a man magnificently at home in nature, a virtuoso of pre-Christian innocence, almost a Portuguese teacher of Zen. Reis is a stoic Horatian, a pagan believer in fate, a player with classical myths less original than Caeiro, but more representative of modern symbolism. De Campos emerges as a Whitmanesque futurist, a dreamer in drunkenness, the Dionysian singer of what is oceanic and windswept in Lisbon. None of this triad resembles the metaphysical solitude, the sense of being an occultist medium which characterise Pessoa's 'own' intimate verse.

 George Steiner, "A man of many parts", in The Observer, Sunday, 3 June 2001.

Richard Zenith on the heteronyms

Álvaro de Campos, the poet-persona who grew old with Pessoa and held a privileged place in his inventor's hearts. Soares, the assistant bookkeeper and Campos, the naval engineer never met in the pen-and-paper drama of Pessoa's heteronyms, who were frequently pitted against one other, but the two writer-characters were spiritual brothers, even if their worldly occupations were at odds. Campos wrote prose, as well as poetry, and much of it reads at it came, so to speak, from the hand of Soares. Pessoa was often unsure who was writing when he wrote, and it's curious that the very first item among the more than 25,000 pieces that make up his archives in the National Library of Lisbon bears the heading  A. de C. (?) or B. de D.  (or something else).

 Richard Zenith, introduction to The Book of Disquiet, Penguin Classics, 2002, p. XI.

Álvaro de Campos

This heteronym was created by Fernando Pessoa as an alter ego who inherited his role from Alexander Search and this one from Charles Robert Anon. The latter was created when Pessoa lived in Durban, while Search was created in 1906, when Pessoa was a student at Lisbon's University, in search of his Portuguese cultural identity, after his return from Durban.

Anon was supposedly English, while Search, although English, was born in Lisbon. After the Portuguese republican revolution, in 1910, and consequent patriotic atmosphere, Pessoa dropped his English heteronyms and Álvaro de Campos was created as a Portuguese alter ego. Álvaro de Campos, born in 1890, was supposedly a Portuguese naval engineer graduated in Glasgow.

Campos sailed to the Orient, living experiences that he describes in his poem "Opiarium". He worked in London (1915), Barrow on Furness and Newcastle (1922), but became unemployed, and returned to Lisbon in 1926, the year of the military putsch that installed dictatorship. He also wrote "Lisbon Revisited (1923)" and "Lisbon Revisited (1926)".

Campos was a decadent poet, but he embraced Futurism; his poetry was strongly influenced by Walt Whitman and Marinetti. He wrote the "Ode Triumphal" and "Ode Maritime", published in the literary journal Orpheu, in 1915, and other unfinished.

While unemployed in Lisbon, he became depressed, returning to Decadentism and Pessimism. Then he wrote his master work, "Tobacco Shop", published in 1933, in the literary journal Presença.

Alberto Caeiro
Pessoa created this heteronym as "Master" of the other heteronyms and even Pessoa himself. 
This fictional character was born in 1889 and died in 1915, at 26, almost the same age as Pessoa's best friend Mário de Sá-Carneiro, who killed himself in Paris in 1916 less than a month shy of his 26th birthday. Thus, Sá-Carneiro seems to have inspired, at least partially, Alberto Caeiro.
 
Caeiro was a humble man of poor education, but a great poet "naif", he was born in Lisbon, but lives almost his life in the countryside, Ribatejo, near Lisbon, where he died. However, his poetry is full of philosophy. He wrote "Poemas Inconjuntos" (Disconnected Poems) and "O Guardador de Rebanhos" (The Keeper of Sheep), published by Fernando Pessoa in his "Art Journal" Athena in 1924–25.

In a famous letter to the literary critic Adolfo Casais Monteiro, dated January 13, 1935, Pessoa describes his "triumphal day", March 8, 1914, when Caeiro "appeared", making him write down all the poetry of "The Keeper of Sheep" at once. Caeiro influenced the Neopaganism of Pessoa, and of the heteronyms António Mora and Ricardo Reis. Poetically, he influenced mainly the Neoclassicism of Reis, which is connected to Paganism.

Ricardo Reis

This heteronym was created by Pessoa as a Portuguese doctor born in Oporto, on September 19, 1887. Reis supposedly studied at a boarding school run by Jesuits in which he received a classical education. He was an amateur latinist and poet; politically a monarchist, he went into exile to Brazil after the defeat of a monarchical rebellion against the Portuguese Republic in 1919. Ricardo Reis reveals his Epicureanism and Stoicism in the "Odes by Ricardo Reis", published by Pessoa in 1924, in his literary journal Athena.

Since Pessoa didn't determine the death of Reis, one can assume that he survived his author who died in 1935. In The Year of the Death of Ricardo Reis (1984), Portuguese Nobel prize winner José Saramago rebuilds, in his own personal outlook, the literary world of this heteronym after 1935, creating a dialog between Ricardo Reis and the ghost of his author.

List of Pessoa's heteronyms

Other writers and their heteronyms 

 Søren Kierkegaard - Had more than a dozen heteronyms with distinct biographies and personalities.
 Bitty Navarro - Mexican-Spanish poet, asexual activist, and BuzzFeed contributor, has explored heteronyms in poetry and microblogging.
 David Solway, Canadian writer, writing as Andreas Karavis.
 Kent Johnson, American scholar and poet writing as Araki Yasusada.
 Peter Russell, English poet, translated The Elegies of Quintilius, a Latin poet.
 Robin Skelton, Canadian poet and occultist, writing as French surrealist Georges Zuk.
 Geoffrey Hill. English poet, translated The Songbook Of Sebastian Arrurruz
 B.H. Fairchild, American poet, writing as Roy Eldridge Garcia.
 Daniel Handler, American writer, writing as Lemony Snicket.
 Romain Gary, French writer, writing as Émile Ajar, Fosco Sinibaldi, Shatan Bogat.
 Antoine Volodine, French writer, writing as Elli Kronauer, Manuela Draeger, Lutz Bassman.
 Brian O'Nolan writing as Flann O'Brien and Myles na gCopaleen.
 Arnon Grunberg writing as Marek van der Jagt.
 Eghia Temirchipashyan, Armenian writer, writing as Graser Atom, Devanio, Melania, Nurania, Graser's Cat ...
 Raymond A. Palmer (1910-1977), American editor and writer; published stories under his own name and multiple pseudonyms, several of which were attributed different personalities and biographies (e.g., "A.E. Steber" was a Russian military officer who engaged in espionage against Nazi Germany before relocating to the US).
 Internet personality MsScribe - Had a similar number and variety of heteronyms to Kierkegaard, used to manipulate the Harry Potter fandom.
 Laura Albert (born 1955) wrote under the name JT LeRoy, an adolescent male persona she described as an "avatar" that allowed her to write things that she was unable to write as herself.
 Jane Holland, poet and novelist, also writes as Victoria Lamb, Elizabeth Moss, Beth Good and Hannah Coates.
 Frank X. Gaspar, Portuguese American poet and novelist, writes as Renata Ferreira, a woman who worked for the resistance in the final years of Portugal's fascist regime in his book The Poems of Renata Ferreira published in 2020.

Heteronyms in music 

 David Bowie - Systematically employed heteronyms as a performer, his personae changing given the content of the album on which they appear, including but not limited to Ziggy Stardust, Aladdin Sane, and The Thin White Duke.
 Nicki Minaj - American singer and rapper also raps as Roman Zolanski and Harajuku Barbie.
 MF Doom - Had several heteronyms such as Madvillain and Viktor Vaughn.
 Eminem - Also raps as Marshall Mathers, Slim Shady, and Stan.
 Lawrence Rothman - Has nine heteronyms such as Elizabeth and Alesiter.

See also 

 Sock puppet (Internet)

Notes 

 ^ ZENITH, Richard (2002), The Book of Disquiet, Penguin Classics, 2002.
 ^ Pessoa, by Richard Zenith
 ^ Pessoa by Richard Zenith
 ^ Pessoa by Richard Zenith
 ^ Pessoa, by Richard Zenith
 ^ Fred Nadis (2013) The Man From Mars: Ray Palmer's Amazing Pulp Journey, NY: Jeremy P. Tarcher/Penguin, p. 74
 ^ Albert, Laura. "Laura Albert at The Moth "My Avatar & Me" " YouTube. Archived from the original on 2021-12-21. Retrieved 2013-01-30.
 ^ "Jane Holland" The Crime Readers' Association.
 ^ "A Guide to the Many Personalities of Nicky Minaj" www.papermag.com. Retrieved 2015-08-27.

References 
See the introductory parts in:

 Fernando Pessoa & Co: Selected Poems, edited and translated by Richard Zenith, Grove Press, 1999
 The Selected Prose of Fernando Pessoa, edited and translated by Richard Zenith, Grove Press, 2002
 The Book of Disquiet, edited and translated by Richard Zenith, Penguin classics, 2003

External links 

 George Steiner, "A man of many parts".
 Fernando Pessoa at Vidas Lusófonas

Narrative techniques